Leslie Drury was an Australian politician who represented the South Australian House of Assembly seat of Mawson for the Labor Party from 1977 to 1979.

References

Year of birth missing (living people)
Members of the South Australian House of Assembly
Possibly living people
Australian Labor Party members of the Parliament of South Australia